Corona Zombies is a 2020 American comedy horror film directed by Charles Band, and produced and distributed by Full Moon Features. Inspired by the COVID-19 pandemic, the film stars Cody Renee Cameron as Barbie, a woman who finds herself facing an outbreak of zombies infected by coronavirus disease 2019 (COVID-19). Alongside Cameron, the film stars Russell Coker and Robin Sydney.

Corona Zombies was released digitally through Full Moon Features' website and app on April 10, 2020. Later that year, it was followed by two sequels also directed by Band, Barbie & Kendra Save the Tiger King and Barbie & Kendra Storm Area 51, with Cameron and Sydney reprising their roles.

Cast
 Cody Renee Cameron as Barbie
 Russell Coker as Corona Zombie
 Robin Sydney as Kendra

Production
Corona Zombies was filmed over a period of 28 days. The film consists primarily of redubbed and repurposed footage from Hell of the Living Dead and Zombies vs. Strippers, as well as clips of real-world news footage.

Release
The film premiered digitally through Full Moon Features' website and app on April 10, 2020.

Reception 
Stuart Heritage of The Guardian called the film "the sort of thing you'd watch drunk in your house at midnight. But then again, that's how you're going to watch all films for the foreseeable future, so it has to be worth a go." The Nationals Katy Gillett, in her review of the film, wrote: "If zombie movies are your thing, and you can acknowledge them as pure escapism that isn't to be taken seriously, then you're probably fine. If not, I'd skip it." Alan Ng of Film Threat called Corona Zombies "a hilarious satire of this whole pandemic", comparing it favorably to the 1966 film What's Up, Tiger Lily? and the television series Mystery Science Theater 3000.

Accolades

Sequels
Corona Zombies was followed by two sequels, Barbie & Kendra Save the Tiger King and Barbie & Kendra Storm Area 51. Both sequels were directed by Band, star Cody Renee Cameron as Barbie and Robin Sydney as Kendra, and were released in 2020.

See also
 Impact of the COVID-19 pandemic on cinema
 Corona (film)
 Coronavirus (india film)                * Songbird                * The Covid Killer

References

External links
 
 

2020 comedy horror films
2020 films
American comedy horror films
American zombie comedy films
Collage film
Films directed by Charles Band
Films about the COVID-19 pandemic
American satirical films
American exploitation films
2020s English-language films
2020s American films